Teresa Zuzanna Ceglecka-Zielonka (born 8 March 1957 in Namysłów) is a Polish politician. She was elected to the Sejm on 25 September 2005, getting 5280 votes in 21 Opole district as a candidate from the Law and Justice list.

See also
Members of Polish Sejm 2005-2007

External links
Teresa Ceglecka-Zielonka - parliamentary page - includes declarations of interest, voting record, and transcripts of speeches.

1957 births
Living people
People from Namysłów
Members of the Polish Sejm 2005–2007
Women members of the Sejm of the Republic of Poland
Law and Justice politicians
21st-century Polish women politicians